

Events
 March 3 – The poet-emperor Trần Nhân Tông ends his reign as third emperor of the Trần dynasty and became Taishang Huang (Thái thượng hoàng)

Works
 Dante completes writing La Vita Nuova

Births

Deaths
 Meir of Rothenburg (born 1215), German rabbi and poet, a major author of the tosafot on Rashi's commentary on the Talmud

13th-century poetry
Poetry